AD 49 (XLIX) was a common year starting on Wednesday (link will display the full calendar) of the Julian calendar. At the time, it was known as the Year of the Consulship of Longus and Veranius (or, less frequently, year 802 Ab urbe condita). The denomination AD 49 for this year has been used since the early medieval period, when the Anno Domini calendar era became the prevalent method in Europe for naming years.

Events

By place

Roman Empire 
 Emperor Claudius marries his niece Agrippina the Younger (approximate date), and most of the real power falls to Agrippina.
 Seneca the Younger becomes Nero's tutor.
 Melankomas is the boxing champion, at the 207th Olympic Games.
 Likely date for the expulsion of the Jews from Rome.
 Nero becomes engaged to Claudia Octavia, daughter of Claudius.
 Agrippina the Younger charges Octavia's first fiancé Lucius Junius Silanus Torquatus with incest. He is brought before the Senate, and sentenced to death.
 In Britain, governor Publius Ostorius Scapula founds a colonia for Roman veterans at Camulodunum (Colchester). Verulamium (St Albans) is probably established as a municipium the same year. A legion is stationed on the borders of the Silures of South Wales in preparation for invasion.

By topic

Religion 
 First apostolic council in Jerusalem ( approximate date)
 The Apostle Paul begins his second missionary journey with Silas while Barnabas goes to Cyprus with Mark.
 The New Testament book Paul's Epistle to the Galatians is probably written.
 Christianity spreads into Europe, especially at Rome and at Philippi (probable date according to chronology derived from the Acts of the Apostles).
<onlyinclude>

Deaths 
 Lollia Paulina, Roman noblewoman and empress (b. AD 15)
 Ma Yuan, Chinese general of the Han Dynasty(b. 14 BC)

References 

0049